Aleysky is a rural locality (a settlement) and the administrative center of Aleysky Selsoviet, Aleysky District, Altai Krai, Russia. The population was 569 as of 2013. There are 11 streets.

Geography 
Aleysky is located 5 km southwest of Aleysk (the district's administrative centre) by road. Aleysk is the nearest rural locality.

References 

Rural localities in Aleysky District